"Sail Along, Silv'ry Moon" is a song written by Harry Tobias and Percy Wenrich in 1937 and performed by Bing Crosby.  It reached #4 on the U.S. pop chart in 1937. Outside of the US, the song peaked at #1 in Canada, Germany and Norway.

Other charting versions
Billy Vaughn released an instrumental version of the song which went to #5 on the U.S. pop chart and #1 in Germany and in Canada in 1957.  The following year, the song went #1 in Norway and made #4 in Australia. It ranked #6 on Billboard's Year-End top 50 singles of 1958.

Other versions
Jerry Blaine and His Stream Line Rhythm released a version of the song as a single in 1938, but it did not chart.
Richard Himber and His Seven Stylists released a version of the song as the B-side to their 1938 single "There's a Gold Mine in the Sky".
Gene Autry released a version of the song as the B-side to his 1946 single "There's a Gold Mine in the Sky".
Karen Chandler and Her Jacks released a version of the song as a single in 1958, but it did not chart.
Andy Williams released a version of the song on his 1959 album, Two Time Winners.
Sil Austin released a version of the song on his 1961 album, Golden Saxophone Hits.
Slim Whitman released a version of the song on his 1961 album, Just Call Me Lonesome.
Frankie Carle, His Piano and Orchestra released a version of the song as a medley with the song "East of the Sun (and West of the Moon)" on their 1962 album, Honky-Tonk Hits By The Dozen.
Jimmy C. Newman released a version of the song on his 1962 album, Jimmy Newman.
Martin Denny released a version of the song on his 1964 album, Hawaii Tattoo.
Billy May and His Orchestra released a version of the song on their 1972 album, As You Remember Them: Great Instrumentals: Volume 2.
Chet Atkins featuring Danny Davis and the Nashville Brass released a version of the song on their 1976 album, The Best of Chet Atkins & Friends.
Ace Cannon released a version of the song on his 1980 album, Golden Classics.
André Rieu and Johann Strauss Orchestra released a version on the album Romantic Moments II
Simons recorded a cover of this song, which aired in the swedish television-program dansbandsdags.

References

1937 songs
1957 singles
1958 singles
Songs with lyrics by Harry Tobias
Songs with music by Percy Wenrich
Bing Crosby songs
Gene Autry songs
Andy Williams songs
Slim Whitman songs
Chet Atkins songs
Danny Davis (country musician) songs
Number-one singles in Germany
Number-one singles in Canada
Decca Records singles
Dot Records singles
Bluebird Records singles
Number-one singles in Norway